Elly Botbijl (born 11 December 1940) is a retired Dutch fencer. She competed in the women's individual and team foil events at the 1960 Summer Olympics.

References

External links
 

1940 births
Living people
Dutch female foil fencers
Olympic fencers of the Netherlands
Fencers at the 1960 Summer Olympics
People from Sukabumi
20th-century Dutch women